The National Archives of Afghanistan are located in Kabul and were established in 1890.

History 
They are kept in a small palace built in 1890 in Kabul by Abdur Rahman Khan, Emir of Afghanistan from 1880 to 1901, but it eventually fell into disrepair. In 1973 it was renovated, and interior decorations, including the painted tin ceiling tiles and woodcarvings, were repaired. The building itself was relatively untouched by rocket attacks in the 1990s and is in good condition, including woodwork and painted tile ceilings. The Taliban protected the documents kept here. However, the air conditioning system that helped preserve historical records has deteriorated.

The inventory has not yet been drawn up and, with the numerous changes of government, the management regrets the loss of certain books or manuscripts. Students and academics use the archives with permission from the Ministry of Culture and Youth. Other visitors are greeted in the exhibition area which displays photocopies of important documents, with some signs written in English.

The oldest archival document was written and sealed by Tamerlane in the xiv th  century . The most precious books date from four to five centuries, they are ancient Korans illuminated with gold letters. One written by Mostafa Heravi is dated 1799 but most manuscript sources of Afghan history do not have a name or date. The means of this institution are summary. For example, electricity was only introduced there recently. The conservation problem of some 1,200 pounds is very current, due to the failure of the air conditioning system (mold). Several have been microfilmed, but reading material is lacking.

In February 2003, a radio advertisement urged the population to bring their old works to the National Archives. The current director is Abdul Rasul Mahajoor.

Gallery

See also 
 List of national archives

References 

Afghanistan
Afghan culture
Historiography of Afghanistan
Archives in Afghanistan